The Alaska tiny shrew (Sorex yukonicus) is a species of shrew. It is endemic to Alaska.

This species was formerly included under the description of the Eurasian least shrew (S. minutissimus). It was described as a separate species in 1997. It was named for the Yukon River.

This shrew occurs in central Alaska, and more recently it has been found in the southwestern part of the state. It always lives near rivers.

This species has tricolored fur in varying shades of gray.

References

Sorex
Fauna of Alaska
Mammals described in 1997
Endemic fauna of Alaska